American singer-songwriter Meghan Trainor has received 14 awards from 60 nominations. Trainor signed a record deal with Epic Records in 2014 and released her debut single "All About That Bass", which earned her Grammy nominations for Record of the Year, and Song of the Year. The song also received an ASCAP Pop Music Award and Billboard Music Awards for both Top Hot 100 Song and Top Digital Song. Trainor's follow-up single, "Lips Are Movin", earned her a nomination for Choice Break-Up song at the Teen Choice Awards. She was recognized by the Music Business Association as the Breakthrough Artist of the Year in 2015. Trainor released her major-label debut album Title that year. It won Favorite Album at the 42nd People's Choice Awards. In 2016, Trainor won the Grammy Award for Best New Artist and received a nomination for Brit Award for International Female Solo Artist.

Trainor has received two nominations at the Hollywood Music in Media Awards for her soundtrack songs "Better When I'm Dancin'" and "I'm a Lady". Trainor's second major-label studio album Thank You was preceded by its lead single "No". The song earned nominations for Favorite Song at the 43rd People's Choice Awards, Best Song to Lip Sync to at the 2017 Radio Disney Music Awards, as well as Choice Music Single: Female at the 2016 Teen Choice Awards. Her song "Me Too" received nominations for Favorite Music Video and Best Song That Makes You Smile at the 2017 Kids' Choice Awards and the 2017 Radio Disney Music Awards respectively. The singer earned nominations for Choice TV Personality at the 2018 Teen Choice Awards for her work on The Four: Battle for Stardom, as well as Fiercest Fans, and Best Song That Makes You Smile for "No Excuses" at the 2018 Radio Disney Music Awards.

Awards and nominations

Notes

References

External links
 List of awards and nominations at the Internet Movie Database

Trainor, Meghan
Awards